Cesare Rossetti (circa 1565-after 1623). was an Italian painter active in Rome.

He was born in Rome, and a follower of Cavalier D'Arpino, whom he assisted in decorating the Lateran Palace.
He is mentioned by Giovanni Baglione in his biographies.

References

1560s births
Year of death unknown
Painters from Rome
16th-century Italian painters
Italian male painters
17th-century Italian painters
Mannerist painters